WSOY-FM (102.9 MHz) is a Top 40 (CHR) radio station licensed to Decatur, Illinois, and serves Central Illinois.  The station is owned by the Neuhoff Corporation and calls itself "Y103".  The call sign is shared with sister station WSOY 1340 AM, a reference to Decatur's role in soybean farming.  On weekdays, Y103 carries two nationally syndicated shows during drive time:  "Brooke & Jeffrey" from KQMV Seattle in mornings and "On Air with Ryan Seacrest" from KIIS-FM Los Angeles in afternoons.

WSOY-FM's radio studios and offices are on South Water Street in Decatur.  The transmitter is on East Pershing Road at Vicki Drive.  WSOY-FM has an effective radiated power (ERP) of 54,000 watts, which is slightly higher than the current maximum of 50,000 watts for Central Illinois.

History
WSOY first received a construction permit for a new FM station on October 7, 1946.  The original frequency was 98.7 MHz, and later as 102.1 MHz.  It received its full license on February 2, 1949, powered at 31,200 watts, broadcasting on 102.1 MHz.  The switch to 102.9 MHz received a construction permit in August 1959 and license on May 31, 1960. The increase to the current 54,000 watts received its construction permit in May 1961 and license on September 7, 1961.  

At first, WSOY-FM largely simulcast the programming of WSOY (1340 AM).  By the late 1960s, it tried an automated country music format, separate from the AM station.  It later switched to beautiful music, playing quarter hour sweeps of mostly soft instrumental cover versions of popular songs.

In the early 1980s, WSOY-FM adopted a Top 40 format and the name "Y-103" to distinguish itself from its AM partner, though it remained mostly on automation until 2000.  At that point, disc jockeys were hired.

References

External links
 Y103 — official website
  — archive of official website until 2015
 

1940s establishments in Illinois
Radio stations established in the 20th century
Contemporary hit radio stations in the United States
Decatur, Illinois
SOY-FM